The 2008–09 Libyan Third Division sees the clubs in the Northern, Eastern and Southern sections play for places in the Libyan Second Division for the 2009–2010 season.

Regional Champions 
Benghazi - Hurriya
Tripoli - Al Amaal
Jabal al Akhdar - Shabaab al Jabal
Sirte - Buraaq
Fezzan - Qurthabia

Eastern Section

Benghazi
 Al Hurriya
 Al Sulfiyoom
 Al Tayaraan
 Al Sha'la
 Al Mujahid
 Nojoom Selmani
 Khalid ben Walid (Benghazi)

Southern Section

Results

Playoffs 
The top team in each regional group qualify to the final stage. The eight teams are split up into two groups of four teams; the first group is made up of the champions of the Tripoli, Zawiya, Misrata and Sabha regions, and the second group is made up of the champions of the Benghazi, Sirte, Jabal al Akhdar and Butnan regions. The four teams in each group will play each other once. The top team in each group wins promotion to the Libyan Second Division for the 2009–10 season. These two teams will then play a play-off match to decide winner of the Libyan Third Division for the 2009–10 season.

Group A 
Al Reaf
Qurthabia
Al Amaal
Al Shati'

Fixtures

Round 1

Round 2
Fixtures announced June 2, 2009

Round 3 
Fixtures announced June 7, 2009

Group B 
Nusoor Murtoubah
Shabaab al Jabal
Al Buraaq
Hurriya

Fixtures

Round 1

Round 2 
Fixtures announced on June 2, 2009

Round 3

Play-off Final 
Al Reaf 3 - 0 Nusoor al Murtoubah

References 

Libyan Third Division
3